Peter Foster (born 1962) is an Australian conman and convicted criminal.

Peter Foster may also refer to:

Peter Foster (Australian rules footballer) (born 1960), former Australian rules footballer
Peter Foster (canoeist) (born 1960), Australian Olympic flatwater canoeist
Peter Foster (cricketer) (1916–1994), English cricketer
Peter Foster (journalist), correspondent for The Daily Telegraph and The Sunday Telegraph and Financial Times
Peter Foster (judge), former English High Court judge
Peter Foster (politician), member of the Western Australian Legislative Council
Peter Foster (rugby league), rugby league footballer of the 1950s for Great Britain and Leigh